This Is the Voice is the second studio album by American punk rock band Agent Orange, released in 1986 by Enigma Records.

A retrospective AllMusic review said, "The long-delayed second Agent Orange album isn't quite Living in Darkness part two, though it's little different from that album in many ways -- same nuclear-strength attack that's equal parts surf and punk intensity, catchy and threatening all at once".

Track listing

References

External links 

 

1986 albums
Agent Orange (band) albums
Enigma Records albums